The University of Michigan–Dearborn (U of M Dearborn, UM–Dearborn, or UMD) is a public university in Dearborn, Michigan. It is one of the two regional universities operating under the policies of the University of Michigan Board of Regents, the other being the University of Michigan–Flint.

UMD is one of the 14 master's universities in the State of Michigan. The university's enrollment is approximately 8,700 students, behind Baker College, ahead of Saginaw Valley State University. The university's four colleges include the College of Arts, Sciences, & Letters, the College of Engineering & Computer Science, the College of Business, and the College of Education, Health, & Human Services. They offer over 100 majors and minors, 43 master's degree programs, and 6 doctoral degree/specialist programs. 

Located in the Metro Detroit region, UMD is also known for its community engagement within the region. Together with Oakland University, the University of Michigan-Flint, and Wayne State University, UMD is one of the four Coalition of Urban and Metropolitan Universities (CUMU) members in the State of Michigan. Fair Lane, a U.S. National Historic Landmark, is located on the Dearborn campus.

History
The history of the University of Michigan–Dearborn began in the mid-1950s, with studies conducted by Ford Motor Company director of training Archie Pearson. These studies concluded that the company was facing a future shortage of college-educated, qualified engineers and junior administrators. This conclusion led Pearson to discreetly inquire of institutions of higher education in Metro Detroit about their interest and willingness to modify their programs to meet the future needs of the automotive industry.

On December 17, 1956, the Ford family gifted both land and capital development funds to the University of Michigan for the creation of a regional university offering upper-division undergraduate and master's level programs. In February 1957, the Regents of the University of Michigan officially accepted the gifts and committed to establishing a new campus in Dearborn. The Dearborn campus would also have a cooperative work-study requirement for its programs in business administration and engineering, which were intended to provide students with real-world experience that would increase their employment prospects. The University of Michigan in Ann Arbor would provide the necessary liberal arts and professional courses to complete a University of Michigan bachelor's or master's degree. Construction on the Dearborn campus began on May 22, 1958, and on October 1 of that year, William E. Stirton was appointed its first director.

The Dearborn campus, known initially as the Dearborn Center of the University of Michigan, opened with an enrollment of 34 students on September 28, 1959. A liberal arts division and programs in electrical engineering and teacher education were added in fall 1960. The campus's first 12 graduates were honored in a commencement ceremony in Ann Arbor on January 20, 1962. In 1963, the campus was renamed the Dearborn Campus of the University of Michigan, to emphasize that it was a free-standing unit of the university.

Proposal for an independent "Fairlane University" 
In May 1969, the Dearborn Campus Planning Study Committee released their report on the future of the institution, which recommended the addition of lower-division undergraduate courses and the expansion of non-cooperative programs. In November 1969, the regents formally approved the committee's recommendations. In February 1970, the Committee on Colleges and Universities of the Michigan House of Representatives discussed a bill that would have separated the Dearborn campus from the University of Michigan as an independent "Fairlane University", an ultimately unsuccessful proposal that was protested by both faculty and students in Dearborn. Oakland University gained institutional independence from Michigan State University in the same year, and later developed into an autonomous research university with an endowment nearly double that of UM-Dearborn.

In August 1970, the Dearborn campus received its first accreditation independent from the Ann Arbor campus, from the North Central Association of Colleges and Schools. In April 1971, it was officially renamed the University of Michigan–Dearborn (UM–Dearborn). In July of that year, Leonard E. Goodall, the vice-chancellor of the University of Illinois at Chicago Circle, was appointed UM–Dearborn's first chancellor. In the fall of 1971, the university officially became a four-year institution as it welcomed its first freshman class. There were 313 freshmen in that first class and overall enrollment grew by 50% to 1,369. University enrollment grew rapidly during the course of the decade, exceeding 6,000 in 1979. UM–Dearborn announced both a $19 million campus development plan and the creation of its Alumni Society in November 1973.

Between 1978 and 1980, three major new buildings were opened on campus: the Fieldhouse and Ice Arena, the University Library, and the University Mall. These additions caused the center of campus to shift south of UM–Dearborn's original four buildings. In July 1980, University of Colorado Denver acting chancellor William A. Jenkins was named the second chancellor of UM–Dearborn. He soon faced a major financial crisis on campus that stemmed from a recession in the state, which resulted in a $500,000 cut from the university's base budget in April 1981. Also in 1981, history professor Sidney Bolkosky established the Holocaust Survivor Oral History Project at UM–Dearborn. In the fall of 1983, minority enrollment on campus reached a record high of 9.6%. The university received a 13.2% increase in its annual appropriation from the state legislature in 1984–85, which enabled it to restore the 3% salary raises that it had cut in 1981–82. In May 1986, UM–Dearborn opened its Armenian Research Center, the first university-affiliated institution of its kind.

In November 1988, Blenda Wilson was inaugurated as the third chancellor of UM–Dearborn. In September 1989, the university began its $11.6 million General Campus Renovation Project, entirely funded by the State of Michigan. In summer 1990, the university terminated its varsity ice hockey program, resulting in head coach Tom Anastos and athletic director Sid Fox announcing their departures from Dearborn. In October, Wilson announced that hockey would become a club sport and the university's basketball and women's volleyball teams would compete in the National Association of Intercollegiate Athletics (NAIA). In April 1991, graduate enrollment at UM–Dearborn exceeded 1,000 for the first time, and in July of that year revenue from tuition surpassed state appropriations. In May 1992, Wilson announced her resignation to take a position at California State University. In January 1993, James C. Renick was inaugurated as her replacement as the university's fourth chancellor. In fall 1995 and again in fall 1996, the university achieved new total enrollment records (8,214 and 8,324, respectively). In March 1997, UM–Dearborn inaugurated the first graduate program in its College of Arts, Sciences, & Letters (CASL), a Master of Arts in Liberal Studies degree. In March 1999, the university's FUTURES Planning Resource Council released its recommendation that UM–Dearborn's "top priority is being nationally regarded as an excellent regional university" and argued this should be achieved by "developing interdisciplinary centers of teaching and research excellence".

In November 2000, Daniel E. Little was inaugurated as the university's fifth chancellor. In 2001, both the Environmental Interpretive Center and the CASL Building were opened on campus. In fall of 2003, university enrollment topped 9,000 for the first time (9,022) and graduate enrollment reached 25% of total enrollment. In September of that year, the university acquired the Fairlane Training Center from Ford, located across Evergreen Road from its main campus, which it renamed the Fairlane Center in February 2004. In November 2003, the renovated University Center (formerly the University Mall) was opened. In October 2006, UM–Dearborn dedicated its new Science Learning and Research Center. In November 2008, the Regents of the University of Michigan approved the first doctoral programs at UM–Dearborn, Doctor of Philosophy (Ph.D.) degrees in Automotive Systems Engineering and Information Systems Engineering, both to begin the following fall. In February 2009, the regents approved a Doctor of Education (Ed.D.) program. In May of that year, they announced the renaming of the School of Management as the College of Business. In 2008, Kiplinger ranked UM–Dearborn 86th nationally in its "Best Values in Public Colleges", while in 2009 U.S. News & World Report ranked it the fourth-best master's-level university in the Midwest.

In September 2013, The Union at Dearborn opened, with its 145 apartments providing the first on-campus student housing since the 1970s. Also that month, UM–Dearborn's School of Education was renamed the College of Education, Health and Human Services. In December 2015, UM–Dearborn conferred its 50,000 cumulative degree. In September 2016, the university's Natural Sciences Building reopened after a $51 million renovation. In April 2018, UM–Dearborn broke ground on a new, $90 million Engineering Lab Building. In 2018, Daniel E. Little resigned as chancellor after 18 years, and was succeeded by Domenico Grasso in August. Grasso was formally installed as the university's sixth chancellor in April 2019.

Campus
The UM–Dearborn campus is located on the former estate of automotive pioneer Henry Ford. It is divided into several sections: The Henry Ford Estate, known as Fair Lane, The Fairlane Center, Main Campus, and the Early Childhood Education Center just south of campus. In addition, the university has over 70 acres (283,000 m2) of nature preserve and a bird observatory, the Rouge River Bird Observatory , which has operated on campus since its founding in 1992, and is the longest-running, full-time urban bird research station in North America.

Main Campus includes the facilities for the College of Arts, Sciences, and Letters (CASL), the College of Engineering and Computer Science (CECS), the Environmental Interpretive Center, Administration, the Mardigian Library, the Institute for Advanced Vehicle Studies, the University Center, the Computing Building, and the Fieldhouse. Within both CASL and CECS, many different buildings house different programs, departments, research centers, student life centers, and academic resources.

Fair Lane
Fair Lane and the nature preserve west of campus are along the Rouge River. There is a small waterfall, rose garden, meadow, a lake, and reflecting pond surrounded by acres of forest. The forest has many walking paths which connect the Environmental Interpretive Center, Henry Ford Community College, Downtown West Dearborn, Hines Drive, the university's Main Campus, and Fair Lane together. Fair Lane recently has been handed over to Edsel and Eleanor Ford House. The Edsel Ford Estate will put forth restoration efforts which will cost 50 million dollars or more. The majority of the funding will go towards full home restoration and grounds preservation. The project will open up rooms which had been unavailable to public tours before.

Academics

Admissions

The 2022 annual ranking of U.S. News & World Report categorizes UMD as "selective". For the Class of 2025 (enrolled fall 2021), UMD received 8,065 applications and accepted 5,546 (68.8%). Of those accepted, 1,084 enrolled, a yield rate (the percentage of accepted students who choose to attend the university) of 19.5%. UMD's freshman retention rate is 83.52%, with 54.6% going on to graduate within six years.

The enrolled first-year class of 2025 had the following standardized test scores: the middle 50% range (25th percentile-75th percentile) of SAT scores was 1050-1300, while the middle 50% range of ACT scores was 22-28.

Academic divisions

There are four colleges at UMD: the College of Arts, Sciences, & Letters (CASL), the College of Engineering & Computer Science (CECS), the College of Business (COB), and the College of Education, Health, & Human Services (CEHHS).

The College of Arts, Sciences, and Letters (CASL), pronounced "castle," is home to five graduate programs, 32 undergraduate majors, and programs in environmental sciences, mathematics, applied statistics,  physical sciences, religious diversity, cultural studies, health policy studies, health psychology, civic engagement, and leadership. CASL traces its origins to the establishment of the Literature, Science, and the Arts division in fall of 1960, which assumed its current name and college-level status in June 1973.

The main building houses the college's administrative offices and the departments of Behavioral Sciences, Mathematics and Statistics, Literature Philosophy Arts (LPA) and Language Culture and Communication (LCC). General purpose classrooms occupy the majority of the first level, along with the campus television studio. Several other programs, such as urban studies and criminal justice, are housed in different buildings spread across campus.

The College of Engineering and Computer Science (CECS) is home to eleven undergraduate degree programs  and twelve graduate degree programs, including six doctoral programs (four Ph.D and two D.Eng.), housed in CIS, ECE, ME, IMSE departments and college Interdisciplinary Programs. Engineering at UM–Dearborn dates to its first academic year, it was reorganized as the School of Engineering in June 1973, and it was renamed the College of Engineering and Computer Science in March 1998.

The COB offers undergraduate and graduate programs. Business programs at UM–Dearborn were organized into the newly formed School of Management in June 1973, which was renamed the College of Business in July 2009.

The College of Education, Health, & Human Services (CEHHS) offers undergraduate, master's, and doctoral programs. It also offers certificate programs for future and current teachers and opportunities for its students in the Early Childhood Education Center (ECEC). The Teacher Education program at UM–Dearborn dates to the fall of 1960, it was reorganized as the Division of Education in June 1973, and it was upgraded to the School of Education in March 1987.

Its most popular undergraduate majors, by 2021 graduates, were:
Psychology (151)
Electrical and Electronics Engineering (136)
Mechanical Engineering (117)
Biology/Biological Sciences (109)
Computer and Information Science (69)
Public Health Education and Promotion (68)

Athletics
The Michigan–Dearborn (UMD) athletic teams are called the Wolverines (or UMD Wolverines). Their colors are maize and blue. The university is a member of the National Association of Intercollegiate Athletics (NAIA), primarily competing in the Wolverine–Hoosier Athletic Conference (WHAC) since the 2004–05 academic year.

UM–Dearborn competes in 16 intercollegiate varsity sports: Men's sports include baseball, basketball, bowling, cross country, golf, ice hockey, lacrosse and soccer; while women's sports include basketball, bowling, cross country, golf, ice hockey, soccer, softball and volleyball. Men's and women's bowling, along with women's ice hockey were added during the 2018–19 academic year.

Accomplishments
The softball team and men's ice hockey team were named WHAC champions respectively in 2017 and 2019. The men's basketball team was named WHAC tournament champions in 2018.

History
UM–Dearborn began varsity athletic competition in fall of 1974, with its soccer program. Beginning in 1977, the athletics teams were known as the Wolves. Its athletics program was substantially reformed in October 1990, with basketball and women's volleyball becoming NAIA sports and hockey being downgraded to club sport status.

Facilities
The University of Michigan-Dearborn Fieldhouse serves as the home to many of the athletic and recreational activities on campus. It was opened in fall of 1978. The venue host home contests for men's and women's basketball, men's and women's ice hockey and volleyball. A new hardwood floor was installed in the gymnasium during the summer of 2016.

Championships
 1980 – Men's Ice Hockey (runner-up) – NAIA
 1983 – Men's Ice Hockey (runner-up) – NAIA
 1984 – Men's Ice Hockey (runner-up) – NAIA
 1992 - Men's Ice Hockey Conference Champions - CSCHL
 1992 – Men's Ice Hockey (runner-up) – ACHA Division I
 1993 - Men's Ice Hockey Conference Champions - CSCHL
 1998 - Men's Ice Hockey Conference Champions - CSCHL
 1998 - Men's Ice Hockey Conference Tournament Champions - CSCHL
 1999 - Men's Ice Hockey Conference Champions - CSCHL
 2008 - Men's Rugby State Champions Div II Tier II
 2016 - Men's Ice Hockey Conference Tournament Champions - GLCHL
 2017 - Men's Ice Hockey Conference Tournament Champions - GLCHL
 2017 - Softball Conference Champions - WHAC
 2018 - Men's Basketball Conference Tournament Champions - WHAC
 2018 - Men's Basketball - NAIA Division 2 National Tournament Appearance
 2019 - Men's Ice Hockey Conference Champions - WHAC

Student life
There are over 125 recognized student organizations (RSOs) and 9 university sponsored organizations (USOs). Both the RSO and USO communities comprise extraordinary interests, from Greek Life, Academic/Professional Organizations, Cultural and Ethnic Organizations, Honor Societies, Political and Social Activist Organizations, Recreational Organizations, and Religious and Spiritual Organizations.

University sponsored organizations:
 The Michigan Journal, the student newspaper of the University of Michigan–Dearborn since 1971.
WUMD, the student radio station of the University of Michigan–Dearborn since 1979.
Campus Video Network
Greek Leadership Council
The Lyceum
Student Activities Board
Student Government
Student Organization Advisory Council (SOAC)
The Wolf Pack

WUMD College Radio is a student-run, free-format radio station that features diversity in music from punk rock to bluegrass, jazz to electronica, and everything in between. Starting in 2007, the station began live broadcasts of UMD sporting events.

Fraternities:
 Alpha Phi Alpha
 Phi Sigma Phi
 Theta Tau
 Tau Kappa Epsilon
 Alpha Psi Lambda
 Phi Beta Sigma
 Phi Delta Epsilon

Sororities:
 Alpha Kappa Alpha
 Alpha Omega Epsilon
 Delta Phi Epsilon
 Delta Sigma Theta
 Kappa Omega Chi (local)
 Phi Mu
 Phi Sigma Sigma
 Sigma Gamma Rho
 Zeta Phi Beta

Student body
As of 2022, the university has an enrollment of 8,224 students. 94% of students are from Michigan. Nearly half of its student body are first-generation college students. The average grade point averages for incoming high school students was a 3.68. 

About half of UM-Dearborn's students enter directly from high school; the remainder are students who have prior college experience either immediately before entering UM-Dearborn or at some earlier point in their lives and careers.

Notable alumni and faculty
 Ismael Ahmed – director of the Michigan Department of Human Services
 Saul Anuzis – chairman of the Michigan Republican Party
 Mark Atkinson – one of the world's top diabetes researchers
 Susy Avery – former chair of the Michigan Republican Party
 Ted Casteel – owner of Bethel Heights Vineyard in the Willamette Valley of Oregon
 George Darany – former member of the Michigan House of Representatives
 Rima Fakih – model, actress, and Miss USA 2010 winner
 Kimberly Frost – novelist
 Kumar Galhotra – president of Ford North America
 Rudy Hatfield – professional basketball player of Barangay Ginebra Kings in the PBA
 Fadwa Hammoud – Solicitor General of Michigan
 Ian Hornak (1944–2002) – founding artist of the hyperrealist and photorealist fine art movements.
Hala Y. Jarbou – United States federal judge for the Western District of Michigan
 Jewell Jones – member of the Michigan House of Representatives
 Huda Kattan – makeup artist, beauty blogger, and founder of cosmetics line Huda Beauty
 Mary Beth Kelly – former Michigan Supreme Court Justice
 Paul S. Kemp – novelist
 David Knezek – former member of the Michigan Senate
 Lesia Liss – former member of the Michigan House of Representatives
 Trevor Rosen – member of award-winning country music act Old Dominion
 Jason Schmitt – journalist and academic
 Soony Saad – Lebanese footballer

References

Sources

External links
 
 Official athletics website

 
University of Michigan-Dearborn
Dearborn
Universities and colleges in Wayne County, Michigan
Public universities and colleges in Michigan
Economy of Metro Detroit
Educational institutions established in 1959
1959 establishments in Michigan